The Respect for Marriage Act (RFMA) is a landmark United States federal law passed by the 117th United States Congress and signed into law by President Joe Biden. It repeals the Defense of Marriage Act (DOMA), requires the U.S. federal government and all U.S. states and territories to recognize the validity of same-sex and interracial civil marriages in the United States, and protects religious liberty. Its first version in 2009 was supported by former Republican U.S. Representative Bob Barr, the original sponsor of DOMA, and former President Bill Clinton, who signed DOMA in 1996.

On June 26, 2015, the U.S. Supreme Court ruled in Obergefell v. Hodges that the 14th Amendment requires all U.S. states to recognize same-sex marriages. This decision rendered the last remaining provision of DOMA unenforceable and essentially made RFMA de facto federal law. The future of same-sex marriage in the United States was put back into question in 2022, when a concurring opinion by Justice Clarence Thomas in Dobbs v. Jackson Women's Health Organization argued the Court "should reconsider" the Obergefell decision. RFMA officially repealed DOMA and requires the federal government to recognize same-sex and interracial marriages, codifying parts of Obergefell, the 2013 ruling in United States v. Windsor, and the 1967 ruling in Loving v. Virginia. In addition, it compels all U.S. states and territories to recognize the validity of same-sex and interracial marriages if performed in a jurisdiction where such marriages are legally performed; this extends the recognition of same-sex marriages to American Samoa, the remaining U.S. territory to refuse to perform or recognize same-sex marriages. 

In July 2022, RFMA was reintroduced to Congress, with revisions including protections for interracial marriages. The Act passed the House in a bipartisan vote on July 19, 2022. Senator Tammy Baldwin of Wisconsin announced on November 14, 2022, that a bipartisan deal had been struck, and that they expected the legislation to reach 60 votes to break the filibuster. A motion of cloture passed 62–37 in the Senate on November 16. On November 29, the Senate passed it by a 61–36 vote, with a large majority of Senate nays originating from Republican Senators in the Southern United States. On December 8, the House agreed to the Senate amendment by a 258–169 vote, with one member voting present (abstention). 39 Republicans voted yea. President Biden signed the bill into law on December 13, 2022. Public opinion polls of same-sex marriage in the United States indicate a strong majority of Americans are in favor; interracial marriage is supported almost universally.

The final version of the bill divided American religious groups morally opposed to same-sex marriage; it was supported by some as a suitable compromise between the rights of LGBT couples and religious liberty, a position that was taken by the Church of Jesus Christ of Latter-day Saints, but was prominently opposed by the U.S. Conference of Catholic Bishops and the Southern Baptist Convention due to their views on sexual ethics. Religious groups that supported the bill in support of their LGBT parishioners include the Episcopal Church, the Evangelical Lutheran Church in America, the Union for Reform Judaism, the Reformed Church in America, the United Church of Christ, and the Presbyterian Church (USA).

Background

Prior to the Supreme Court's 1967 ruling in Loving, anti-miscegenation laws were still in force in 16 states, all prohibiting interracial marriage. Until 1996, the federal government of the United States customarily recognized marriages conducted legally in any state for the purpose of federal legislation. Following an unsuccessful lawsuit aimed at legalizing same-sex marriage in Hawaii, the United States Congress passed the Defense of Marriage Act, one section of which forbids the federal government from recognizing same-sex marriages. The Supreme Court ruled this section unconstitutional in the 2013 case United States v. Windsor.

In June 2022, the Court ruled in Dobbs v. Jackson Women's Health Organization that the Constitution does not confer the right to an abortion, overturning the 50-year-old precedent of Roe v. Wade. Writing for the majority, Samuel Alito stated that fears that the same arguments that overturned Roe might also touch upon "matters such as intimate sexual relations, contraception, and marriage" were "unfounded". However, in a concurring opinion, Clarence Thomas argued that the Court should go further in future cases, reconsidering other past Supreme Court decisions that granted rights based on substantive due process, such as Griswold v. Connecticut (the right to contraception), Obergefell v. Hodges (the right to same-sex marriage), and Lawrence v. Texas (the right to engage in private sexual acts).

In response, in July 2022 the House passed bills aimed to protect rights that Thomas had mentioned, with the Respect for Marriage Act specifically ensuring that the right to same-sex and interracial marriages would remain part of federal statue law even if the Court ruled at some future date that they were not constitutionally guaranteed.

Text

H.R.8404, the Respect for Marriage Act, as signed into law by President Joe Biden on December 13, 2022, reads:

Impact
In addition to requiring all states to recognize interracial or same-sex marriages performed in another domestic or foreign jurisdiction, it also requires all territories and possessions of the United States to recognize marriages performed elsewhere. Prior to enactment of the Act, American Samoa was the only U.S. territory which neither performed nor recognized same-sex marriages, even if performed legally in another jurisdiction of the United States or elsewhere. It does not apply to federally-recognized Native American nations, which are free to determine their own policy on performance and recognition. 
As of December 2022, the Choctaw Nation is reviewing their marriage law for conflict with the Respect for Marriage Act.

Choice of law problem 
In addition to repealing DOMA, the legislation would establish a method for the federal government to determine whether a marriage is valid for federal purposes, a legal dilemma known as choice of laws. Anticipating that federal courts and administrators would need to determine the validity for federal purposes of a marriage that is recognized in one state and not another, or in a foreign country and not by every U.S. state, it creates two tests. If celebrated in a state of the U.S. (with "state" interpreted to include territories and the District of Columbia), a marriage is valid for federal purposes if valid in that state. If celebrated elsewhere, a marriage is valid for federal purposes if it is valid in at least one U.S. state.

Legal scholars disputed whether the language of the Respect for Marriage Act was an appropriate solution to the problem. Lynn Wardle wrote that it "is substantively biased to circumvent state policies that do not allow or recognize same-sex marriage" and "a violation of federalism". William Baude endorsed the language of the Respect for Marriage Act. He argued that the options are to give priority to the place a marriage is celebrated or to the domicile of the married couple, that one's domicile is more easily manipulated, and that basing the choice of law on the place of celebration "promotes predictability and stability".

Law scholar Ilya Somin writes that the provision requiring states to recognize same-sex marriages contracted in other states is more likely to have constitutionality issues in the court system than the provisions that apply to the definition of marriage used in federal law; he also notes that the Act contains a severability provision in case one part of the Act is found unconstitutional.

Legislative progress

111th Congress (2009–2011) 

The 2009 bill was introduced by U.S. Representative Jerrold Nadler of New York on September 15, 2009, and garnered 120 cosponsors.

112th Congress (2011–2013) 
The 2011 bill was introduced by U.S. Representative Jerrold Nadler of New York on March 16, 2011, and a U.S. Senate version was introduced by Dianne Feinstein of California on the same day. President Barack Obama announced his support for the bill on July 19, 2011.

House 
In September 2011, Ileana Ros-Lehtinen of Florida became the 125th cosponsor of the bill in the U.S. House of Representatives and the first Republican member of the U.S. Congress to announce support for the bill. In December 2012, Richard Hanna and Charles Bass became the next Republicans to cosponsor the bill.

Senate 

On July 20, 2011, Sen. Patrick Leahy of Vermont chaired the first-ever congressional hearing on a proposal to repeal the Defense of Marriage Act (DOMA). On October 25, 2011, Leahy announced that the Senate Judiciary Committee would begin debate on November 3, 2011, with a committee vote likely to happen the following week. On November 3, 2011, the bill was debated in the Senate Judiciary Committee, where its passage was a foregone conclusion due to sufficient votes to pass being found in the 10 Democratic members of the committee, who are cosponsors of the bill; however, Republicans on the Committee requested the vote be delayed one week. During the debate Sen. Feinstein noted that DOMA denies same-sex couples more than 1,100 federal rights and benefits that are provided to all other members of that class, legally married couples, including rights to Social Security spousal benefits, protection from estate taxes when a spouse passes away, and the ability to file taxes jointly and claim certain deductions. The Senate Judiciary Committee voted 10–8 in favor of advancing the bill to the Senate floor.

113th Congress (2013–2015) 
The bill's sponsors decided not to reintroduce the Respect for Marriage Act in 2013 until the United States Supreme Court issued a decision in United States v. Windsor. They reintroduced it on June 26, the same day the Court ruled in that case that Section 3 of the Defense of Marriage Act was unconstitutional.

114th Congress (2015–2017) 
The aforementioned lawmakers Representative Jerrold Nadler of New York and Senator Dianne Feinstein of California reintroduced the legislation on the first day of the 114th Congress. Nadler remarked, "We must finish the job begun by the Supreme Court". In terms of co-sponsors, the proposal soon accrued 77 co-sponsors in the House and 41 in the Senate. The news received a warm welcome from LGBT rights groups such as the American Military Partner Association, which stated that Congressional action had to take place in order to assist same-sex military couples seeking veterans benefits.

Section 2 of DOMA, the last substantive provision of that act remaining viable after United States v. Windsor, was rendered obsolete in Obergefell v. Hodges in June 2015.

117th Congress (2021–2023) 
The Supreme Court ruling in Dobbs v. Jackson Women's Health Organization in June 2022 overturned Roe v. Wade and Planned Parenthood v. Casey. In his concurrence, Justice Clarence Thomas postulated that the court should revisit other past cases which granted rights based on substantive due process, including the right of same-sex marriages from Obergefell, leading to concerns from lawmakers.

First House vote 
In July 2022, the House Judiciary Committee Chairman Jerrold Nadler (D-NY), Senator Dianne Feinstein (D-CA), Congressional LGBTQ+ Equality Caucus Chairman David Cicilline (D-RI), Senator Tammy Baldwin (D-WI) and Senator Susan Collins (R-ME) announced the re-introduction of the Respect for Marriage Act, which was revised to include protections for interracial marriages to codify Loving v. Virginia. The Act passed the House (267–157) on July 19, 2022, with 47 Republicans joining all Democrats in voting in the affirmative.

Senate passage 
The Senate initially planned to vote on the bill before the 2022 midterm elections. However, because it was unclear whether it would receive enough votes to end debate, the consideration of the bill was delayed by Majority Leader Chuck Schumer. On November 14, 2022, a group of bipartisan senators, including Rob Portman (R-OH), Kyrsten Sinema (D-AZ), Thom Tillis (R-NC), Tammy Baldwin (D-WI), and Susan Collins (R-ME) announced they had reached an amendment compromise to include language for religious protections and clarify that the bill did not legalize polygamous marriage. The amendment specifies that nonprofit religious organizations will not be required to provide services for the solemnization or celebration of a marriage. Shortly after, Senate Majority Leader Chuck Schumer announced that he would bring the modified bill to the Senate floor.

On November 16, 2022, the Senate invoked cloture on the motion to proceed (62–37) to the amended bill. All 50 Democratic senators and 12 Republicans (Roy Blunt, Richard Burr, Shelley Moore Capito, Susan Collins, Joni Ernst, Cynthia Lummis, Lisa Murkowski, Rob Portman, Mitt Romney, Dan Sullivan, Thom Tillis, and Todd Young) voted in favor of advancing the bill.

On November 29, 2022, the Senate voted 61–36 to pass the bill. Voting in favor of the bill were 49 Democrats and the same 12 Republicans who had voted to advance it. Two Republicans (Ben Sasse and Patrick Toomey) and one Democrat (Raphael Warnock, who co-sponsored the bill) did not vote.

Second House vote
On December 8, 2022, the House passed (258–169–1) the Senate's version of the Act, with 39 Republicans joining all Democrats in voting in the affirmative.

Signing into law

On December 13, 2022, President Biden signed the Respect for Marriage Act into law in a ceremony that was held on the White House lawn. Pelosi, Schumer, Harris, and Biden all spoke at the event, which also featured performances by the Gay Men's Chorus of Washington, D.C, as well as musicians Sam Smith and Cyndi Lauper. Gina Nortonsmith and Heidi Nortonsmith, the lesbian couple who was one of seven same-sex couples who sued the state of Massachusetts for same-sex marriage rights in the 2001 Goodridge v. Department of Public Health case, were among those who spoke at the event as well.

Legislative history
As of December 13, 2022:

Public opinion

Same-sex marriage 

A September 2022 Grinnell College National Poll found that 74% of Americans believe same-sex marriage should be a guaranteed right while 13% disagreed and 13% were uncertain.

Gallup found that nationwide public support for marriage equality for same-sex couples reached 50% in May 2011, 60% in May 2015, and 70% in May 2021.

The Pew Research Center found 40% in 2010, 50% in 2013, and 61% in 2019. By 2016, 83% of Americans aged 18–29 supported same-sex marriage. In 2018, 60% of Americans said they would not mind if their child married someone of the same gender.

Annual polling conducted by Gallup each May in 2017, 2018, 2019 and 2020 has found support for same-sex marriage stable, with two-thirds of Americans indicating that same-sex marriage should be recognized as valid under law (a range of 63% to 67% was recorded). In 2020, 67% of respondents stated that same-sex marriage should be legally recognized as valid under the law.

As of 2021, there is majority support for same-sex marriage in 47 states, ranging from 50% in South Carolina to 85% in Massachusetts. There is plurality support in Alabama, with 49% supporting and 47% opposing. Only Mississippi and Arkansas have majority opposition to same-sex marriage; in Mississippi, 55% oppose and 44% support, while in Arkansas, 52% oppose and 47% support same-sex marriage.

Interracial marriage 

Gallup found that nationwide public support for interracial marriage rose from around 4% in 1958, more than 50% in 1994, to 94% in 2021.

Religious organizations 
The final version of the bill divided American religious groups opposed to same-sex marriage. It was supported by some as a suitable compromise between the rights of LGBT couples and religious liberty, a position that was taken by the Church of Jesus Christ of Latter-day Saints, but was prominently opposed by the United States Conference of Catholic Bishops and the Southern Baptist Convention due to their views on sexuality.

On November 15, 2022, the Church of Jesus Christ of Latter-day Saints released a statement regarding the RFMA, calling a bill that included "religious freedom protections while ... preserving the rights of ... LGBTQ [people] ... the way forward", while stating that church doctrine would remain unchanged in not recognizing same-sex marriages. The Church has supported some legislation in the past that supported LGBT rights, as long as they also included protections for religious freedom.

On December 1, 2022, the United States Conference of Catholic Bishops stated that "This bill fails to include clear, comprehensive, and affirmative conscience protections for religious organizations and individuals who uphold the sanctity of traditional marriage that are needed."

Baptist Joint Committee leaders in support of the bill criticized opponents for stoking unreasonable fear, and erroneously arguing that civil rights for some, somehow means less religious rights for themselves.  They noted the bill deals with civil marriage and has no impact on the institution of religious rites of marriage.

Other denominations supported the measure. It was supported by over 40 other faith organizations in a joint letter to the Senate, including the Episcopal Church, the Evangelical Lutheran Church in America, Hindus for Human Rights, the Interfaith Alliance, Jewish Women International, Muslims for Progressive Values, the National Council of Jewish Women, the Presbyterian Church (USA), the Reconstructionist Rabbinical Association, the Religious Action Center of Reform Judaism, the Sikh Coalition, the Union for Reform Judaism, the Unitarian Universalist Association, and the United Church of Christ. Most of those organizations who signed the letter allow for same-sex weddings in their facilities and affirm LGBT parishioners.

See also

 (2009)
Marriage age in the United States
Marriage Protection Act (2004)
Rights and responsibilities of marriages in the United States

State Marriage Defense Act – proposed conservative law

References

External links

 Respect for Marriage Act (PDF/details) as enacted in the US Statutes at Large
  of the 117th Congress (2021-2022) via Congress.gov
  of the 113th Congress (2013-2015) via Congress.gov
  of the 112th Congress (2011-2013) via Congress.gov
  of the 111th Congress (2009-2011) via Congress.gov

Acts of the 117th United States Congress
Proposed legislation of the 111th United States Congress
Proposed legislation of the 112th United States Congress
Proposed legislation of the 113th United States Congress
2009 in LGBT history
2011 in LGBT history
2013 in LGBT history
2015 in LGBT history
2022 in LGBT history
Defense of Marriage Act
Same-sex marriage legislation in the United States
Interracial marriage in the United States
Anti-racism in the United States
LGBT law in the United States